The San Antonio Mastersingers is the official chorus of the San Antonio Symphony.  In addition to performing with the symphony, the chorus performs several other concerts annually in San Antonio, Texas, and surrounding communities.  The 2007–2008 season was to culminate with a performance at Carnegie Hall in New York.

See also
San Antonio Symphony

References

External links
San Antonio Mastersingers Official website

Texas classical music
Musical groups from San Antonio